Ronald "Ron" S. Hill (birth unknown) is a Welsh former rugby union, and professional rugby league footballer who played in the 1960s and 1970s, and rugby league commentator for BBC Radio Leeds. He played club level rugby union (RU) for Cardiff RFC, and representative level rugby league (RL) for Wales, and at club level for Castleford (Heritage № 488), Salford and Featherstone Rovers (Heritage № 503), as a goal-kicking , i.e. number 13, during the era of contested scrums.

Playing career

International honours
Ron Hill won 2 caps for Wales (RL) in 1969–1970 while at Salford.

County League appearances
Ron Hill played in Castleford's victory in the Yorkshire County League during the 1964–65 season.

County Cup Final appearances
Ron Hill played right-, i.e. number 3, and scored a try, and 2-goals in Castleford's 11-22 defeat by Leeds in the 1968 Yorkshire County Cup Final during the 1968–69 season at Belle Vue, Wakefield on Saturday 19 October 1968.

References

External links
(archived by web.archive.org) Castleford RLFC A to Z Player List (All Time) at thecastlefordtigers.co.uk
Past Players → G & H at cardiffrfc.com
Statistics at cardiffrfc.com

Living people
BBC sports presenters and reporters
Cardiff RFC players
Castleford Tigers players
Dewsbury Rams coaches
Featherstone Rovers players
Place of birth missing (living people)
Rugby league locks
Rugby league players from Cardiff
Rugby union fullbacks
Rugby union players from Cardiff
Salford Red Devils players
Wales national rugby league team players
Welsh rugby league commentators
Welsh rugby league players
Welsh rugby union players
Year of birth missing (living people)